Jumex can refer to:

Jumex, the nectar or juice brand popular in Mexico
La Colección Jumex, an art collection housed on the Jumex factory grounds
Trade name of selegiline, an anti-Parkinson drug